The 1904 Nebraska gubernatorial election was held on November 8, 1904.

Incumbent Republican Governor John H. Mickey won re-election to a second term, defeating Democratic and Populist fusion nominee George W. Berge with 49.67% of the vote.

General election

Candidates
Major party candidates
George W. Berge, Populist, Democratic fusion candidate, attorney, Fusion candidate for Nebraska's 1st congressional district in 1900
John H. Mickey, Republican, incumbent Governor

Other candidates
Rev. Clarence F. Swander, Prohibition
Benjamin H. Vail, Socialist

Results

References

1904
Nebraska
Gubernatorial